Tunnel View is a scenic viewpoint on California State Route 41 in Yosemite National Park. Visitors have seen and documented the iconic and expansive views of Yosemite Valley from the overlook since its opening in 1933.

The large viewpoint area is located directly east of the Wawona Tunnel portal, as one enters Yosemite Valley from points south. The view looks eastward into Yosemite Valley, and includes surrounding features, such as the southwest face of El Capitan on the left, Half Dome on the axis, and Bridalveil Fall on the right. 

For many arriving by road, this is the stunning first view, upon suddenly exiting the long and dark tunnel, of Yosemite Valley and its setting. A turn-out with parking lot accommodates leaving vehicles behind, to take it all in.  The trailhead, for the hiking trail up and south to Inspiration Point, is located here.

See also

 National Register of Historic Places listings in Yosemite National Park
 Index: Yosemite National Park

References

History of Mariposa County, California  
Tourist attractions in Mariposa County, California
National Park Service rustic in Yosemite National Park
1933 establishments in California